The King Drinks is a 1640 painting by Jacob Jordaens, now in the Royal Museum of Fine Arts of Belgium in Brussels. It shows the Twelfth Night king.

Sources
 Cirlot, Lourdes (ed.): Jordaens, «El rey bebe», en las pp. 108-111 de Museos Reales de Bellas Artes • Bruselas, Col. «Museos del Mundo», Tomo 25, Espasa, 2007. 

Collections of the Royal Museums of Fine Arts of Belgium
1640 paintings
Paintings by Jacob Jordaens
Food and drink paintings
Musical instruments in art